Aathi Narayana is a 2012 Tamil language film directed by Vetrivendhan, which stars Kajan and Meera Jasmine. After a four-year delay in production, the film released on 27 April 2012.

Cast
Kajan as Aathinarayana
Meera Jasmine as Laila
Karunas
Yogitha
Manobala
Mayilsamy

Production
The project was announced in March 2008 with the production house announcing that they had audaciously signed Meera Jasmine to feature alongside a newcomer in their new project titled Deivamagan - though the title was changed after pressure from the makers of an old film with the same name. The director, debutant Vetrivendhan, revealed that the team initially wanted to title the film as Deiva Magan as the film revolved around a psychotic character but later opted to call it Aathi Narayana after the lead character's name. Shooting took place throughout late 2008 and in early 2009 with the November rains hampering progress.

The audio release of the film was held on 25 August 2009 with director Perarasu taking the opportunity as a stage to vent out against heroines who get overpaid.

Soundtrack
The music was composed by Srikanth Deva.

Release
The film eventually released on 27 April 2012 across Tamil Nadu with little publicity alongside another delayed Tamil film Leelai.

References

2012 films
2010s Tamil-language films
Films scored by Srikanth Deva